"Papermoon" (stylized as "PAPERMOON") is Tommy heavenly6's 9th single and Tomoko Kawase's 16th single overall, which was released on December 10, 2008. Since The Brilliant Green made their comeback, Kawase had been very inactive as a solo singer. Since "Papermoon" has been released, it marks her first solo single in over a year. "Papermoon" was featured as the second opening song to the anime Soul Eater. "Papermoon"'s B-side is a song called "Ruby Shoes", which is possibly in reference to the overall theme of the "Papermoon" music video. "Papermoon" peaked at #10 on the Oricon singles chart.

Music video
The music video features Tommy heavenly6 and her band in a setting which resembles The Wizard of Oz. Her band is dressed in matching attire featuring a tin man, scarecrow, and a lion. Kawase herself is dressed up to resemble Dorothy. Kawase is also shown singing in a room that very much resembles a scene in The Wizard of Oz in which Dorothy's house is taken up into the tornado. Dorothy then looks out the window of her room to see many things and people familiar to her. In the video, things and people from Tommy heavenly6's past videos can be seen. Such as, Tommy February6 and Santa Claus riding a panda bear from Tommy heavenly6's "I Love Xmas" PV, to the cart pulled by a bull she rides in in her "Pray" PV, and other miscellaneous objects.

Track listing

External links
Official Site

2008 singles
Anime songs
Tomoko Kawase songs
Songs written by Tomoko Kawase
2008 songs
Defstar Records singles
Songs written by Shunsaku Okuda